Kevin Christie (born 1 April 1976) is a Scottish former footballer, who played for Aberdeen, East Fife, Motherwell, Falkirk, and Airdrie United. Kevin started his senior career with the Lewis United Juniors
 
After 45 appearances over two seasons he signed for Aberdeen Football Club his boyhood club. He only made 4 substitute appearances before signing for East Fife. After playing only 9 games for the fife team he secured a moved to Motherwell Football Club for a fee of £20,000.He left the steelmen in the season 98/99 season to join Falkirk on a free transfer. At Falkirk he won the Scottish first division season 2002/03. Leaving falkirk the following season to join Airdrie United and again he won the Scottish second division. He played for another season with the lanarkshire club, before retiring in 2006

External links

1976 births
Living people
Footballers from Aberdeen
Association football defenders
Scottish footballers
Aberdeen F.C. players
East Fife F.C. players
Motherwell F.C. players
Falkirk F.C. players
Airdrieonians F.C. players
Scottish Football League players
Scottish Premier League players